The Callander-Presnell, registered as the Stan Fox Stakes is an Australian Turf Club Group 2 Thoroughbred horse race for three-year-olds at set weights, over a distance of 1,600 metres. It is held annually at Randwick Racecourse, Sydney, Australia in September. Total prize money for the race is A$1,000,000.

History
The race is named for the New South Wales industrialist and racehorse owner-breeder Stan Fox, who died in 1974.

Grade
 1975–1984 - Principal race
 1985–1988 - Listed race
 1989–1995 - Group 3
 1996 onwards - Group 2

Distance
 1978–2010 – 1400 metres
 2011 onwards - 1500 metres

Venue
 1975–2003 - Randwick Racecourse
 2004 - Warwick Farm Racecourse
 2005–2010  onwards - Randwick Racecourse
 2011–2018  - Rosehill Racecourse
 2019 - Randwick Racecourse

Winners

 2022 - Golden Mile
 2021 - Hilal
 2020 - Peltzer
 2019 - Colada
 2018 - Tarka
 2017 - Gold Standard
 2016 - Impending
 2015 - Press Statement
 2014 - Shooting To Win
 2013 - Eurozone
 2012 - Kabayan
 2011 - Manawanui
 2010 - Decision Time
 2009 - Denman
 2008 - Dreamscape
 2007 - †race not held
 2006 - Court Command
 2005 - Paratroopers
 2004 - Wager
 2003 - Ambulance
 2002 - Rare Insight
 2001 - Lonhro
 2000 - Dynamic Love
 1999 - Pins
 1998 - Kenwood Melody
 1997 - General Nediym
 1996 - West Point
 1995 - Octagonal
 1994 - Marwina
 1993 - Campaign Warrior
 1992 - Ghost Story
 1991 - Greig
 1990 - Sir Patrick
 1989 - Show County
 1988 - From The Planet
 1987 - High Regard
 1986 - Top Avenger
 1985 - Crossroads
 1984 - Burraboolee 
 1983 - All Chant 
 1982 - Wild Rice 
 1981 - Note Of Victory 
 1980 - Integrity 
 1979 - Pink Posy 
 1978 - Acamar
 1977 - Big Treat 
 1976 - Gentle James
 1975 - Hydahban

† Not held because of outbreak of equine influenza

See also
 List of Australian Group races
 Group races

References

Horse races in Australia
Randwick Racecourse